Chad Beyer (born August 15, 1986) is an American former professional road racing cyclist, who rode professionally between 2009 and 2017 for the , , , ,  and  teams. Beyer's most notable achievement was during the 2010 Tour de Romandie, when he won the Points Classification.

Born in Kansas City, Missouri, Beyer currently resides in Tucson, Arizona.

Major results
Sources:

2003
 3rd Road race, National Junior Road Championships
2004
 2nd Road race, National Junior Road Championships
2008
 1st Stage 3 (TTT) Tour of Belize
2009
 10th U.S. Air Force Cycling Classic
2010
 1st  Points classification Tour de Romandie
2012
 2nd Overall Tour of the Gila
1st Mountains classification
 7th Road race, National Road Championships
2013
 10th Overall Tour de Beauce
2014
 6th Winston-Salem Cycling Classic
 8th Overall Tour of Qinghai Lake
2016
 4th Road race, National Road Championships
 6th Philadelphia International Cycling Classic
 8th Winston-Salem Cycling Classic
2017
 8th Overall Grand Prix Cycliste de Saguenay
1st Stage 3

References

External links
 

American male cyclists
1986 births
Living people
Sportspeople from Tucson, Arizona